Ponnukku Thanga Manasu is a 1973 Indian Tamil-language romantic drama film, produced by P. Madhavan and directed by Devaraj–Mohan. The film stars Sivakumar, Jayachitra, Vijayakumar and Vidhubala, with Manorama, K. A. Thangavelu and M. R. R. Vasu in supporting roles. It was released on 2 June 1973. The film was remade in Malayalam as Bhoomidevi Pushpiniyayi.

Plot 

Ramu is a poor orphan who dreams of becoming a collector. Shankar, his rich best friend, assists him financially and by providing him a place to stay. Geetha and Shanthi are college students and best friends who often clash due to the differences in their beliefs. Geetha is rich, arrogant and feels entitled to special treatment due to her wealth. Shanthi is poor and believes that all people should be treated with respect regardless of wealth. Both friendships end due to various circumstances. When the four meet years later, Geetha and Shanthi challenge each other over their worldviews – will wealth or hard-work and respect win?

Cast 
 Sivakumar as Ramu
 Jayachitra as Shanthi
 Vijayakumar as Shankar
 Vidhubala as Geetha
 K. A. Thangavelu
 M. R. R. Vasu
 C. K. Saraswathi
 Manorama
 S. N. Lakshmi
 Sami Kannu
 Chandran Babu as Pakkiri
 I. S. R

Production 
Ponnukku Thanga Manasu was directed by Devaraj–Mohan making their directorial debut and it was produced by their mentor P. Madhavan under his production company Arun Prasad Movies. The title was derived from a song from Raman Ethanai Ramanadi (1970) directed by Madhavan. Vijayakumar, who went on to become one of the popular actors in Tamil cinema, made his acting debut in this film as a leading actor.

Soundtrack 
Music was composed by G. K. Venkatesh and lyrics were written by Kannadasan, Poovai Senguttuvan and Muthulingam. The song "Thanjavoor Seemayile" was composed by Ilaiyaraaja who was Venkatesh's assistant at that time; however his name was not credited in the title credits. The song also marked Muthulingam's debut as lyricist.

Reception 
Kanthan of Kalki favourably reviewed the film for Devaraj–Mohan's direction and Balamurugan's writing.

References

External links 
 

1970s feminist films
1970s Tamil-language films
1973 films
1973 romantic drama films
Films about women in India
Films directed by Devaraj–Mohan
Films scored by G. K. Venkatesh
Indian black-and-white films
Indian buddy films
Indian female buddy films
Indian feminist films
Indian romantic drama films
Tamil films remade in other languages